Naotake (written: 直剛, 尚武 or 尚丈) is a masculine Japanese given name. Notable people with the name include:

, Japanese anime producer
, Japanese footballer
,  Japanese diplomat and politician

Japanese masculine given names